Robin Ian Henry Benbow Dyer is a former English cricketer and was, until Dec 2022, the  Headmaster of Ampleforth College, a co-educational Catholic boarding school in North Yorkshire.

Dyer was born in Hertford. He studied at Durham University (Collingwood College) and captained the cricket team, having already made appearances for the Warwickshire 2nd XI. He graduated from Durham with a degree in Politics. He appeared in 65 first-class matches as a righthanded batsman who bowled right arm medium pace. He scored 2,843 runs, making three first-class hundreds and 18 fifties, with a highest score of 109* and held 39 catches. He took no wickets with a best performance of none for 2.

In one day cricket, he played 42 matches for Warwickshire, making one century and two scores of fifty, and played in the 1984 Benson and Hedges Cup final at Lord's, when Warwickshire lost to Lancashire.

After leaving Warwickshire in 1986 Dyer became a schoolmaster teaching Politics at Wellington College. He was a Housemaster there from 1990 to 2002 and was promoted to Second Master in 2002, continuing until 2019 and serving as Acting Master in the Michaelmas term of 2005 and in the Lent term of 2014. He worked on the project to create Wellington College International Tianjin and its sister schools in Shanghai and also on the partnership with the Wellington College Academy. He was also in charge of the cricket 1st XI from 1989 to 2003.

In July 2019, Dyer was appointed as  Headmaster of Ampleforth College steering the College through turbulent times

Notes

1958 births
English cricketers
Headmasters of Ampleforth College
Warwickshire cricketers
Living people
Alumni of Collingwood College, Durham